37 mm gun or 3.7 cm gun can refer to several weapons or weapons systems. The "37  mm" refers to the inside diameter of the barrel of the gun, and therefore the diameter of the projectile it fires. However, the overall size and power of the gun itself can vary greatly between different weapons, in spite of them all being called "37 mm" guns.

The 37 mm version of the Maxim gun used by both sides during World War I
QF 1 pounder pom-pom, the British version
37 mm automatic air defense gun M1939 (61-K), a Soviet World War II anti-aircraft gun
37 mm anti-tank gun M1930 (1-K), a Soviet World War II anti-tank gun
37 mm Gun M1, an American World War II anti-aircraft gun
37 mm Gun M3, an American World War II anti-tank gun
3.7 cm Flak 18/36/37/43, a German World War II anti-aircraft gun
3.7 cm PaK 36, a German World War II gun
3.7 cm SK C/30, a German World War II naval anti-aircraft gun
BK 3,7, a German World War II airborne anti-tank gun
Bofors 37 mm, a Swedish designed anti-tank gun
Cannone-Mitragliera da 37/54 (Breda), an Italian World War II naval anti-aircraft gun
Canon de 37 mm Modèle 1925, a French World War II naval anti-aircraft gun
Canon d'Infanterie de 37 modèle 1916 TRP, a French World War I gun; In US World War I service known as the 37mm M1916
COW 37 mm gun, a British World War II airborne anti-tank gun
M4 cannon, an American World War II airborne anti-tank gun
Milkor Stopper 37/38 mm riot gun, a riot gun
Nudelman N-37, a Soviet airborne auto-cannon
Nudelman-Suranov NS-37, a Soviet World War II airborne anti-tank auto-cannon
Puteaux SA 18, a French semi-automatic gun mounted on armored vehicles and in bunkers used during and after World War I
Skoda 37 mm A7, a Czech World War II gun
Skoda 37 mm Model 1934, a World War II gun
Skoda 37 mm Model 1937, a World War II gun
Type 11 37 mm infantry gun, a World War II Japanese infantry support gun
Type 1 37 mm anti-tank gun, a World War II Japanese anti-tank gun
37 mm trench gun M1915, a World War I Russian gun
37 mm flare, grenade launcher system
3.7 cm ÚV vz. 38

37 mm artillery